Showtime Championship Boxing is a television boxing program airing on Showtime.  Debuting in March 1986, it is broadcast live on the first Saturday of every month.  Showtime Championship Boxing, which is very similar to HBO World Championship Boxing, features Mauro Ranallo on play-by-play, Al Bernstein as the color analyst, Jimmy Lennon (Sr. and Jr.) as ring announcers, and Jim Gray as reporter.

A sister program, ShoBox: The New Generation, occasionally airs on Friday nights; these broadcasts feature fights between boxing prospects.

On limited occasions, Showtime has aired cards on the CBS broadcast network, with the telecasts being billed as a special edition of Showtime Championship Boxing rather than being billed as a CBS Sports broadcast.

Notable fights
 "Marvelous" Marvin Hagler defeated John "The Beast" Mugabi in an 11th-round knockout on the debut broadcast of Showtime Championship Boxing on March 10, 1986. On the same undercard, Gaby Canizales defeated Richie Sandoval (who subsequently almost died from the blows received in this bout) and Thomas Hearns defeated James Shuler, who died a week after this bout in a motorcycle accident.
 Mike Tyson headlined multiple pay-per-view heavyweight fights, including:
 Mike Tyson vs. Donovan Ruddock and Mike Tyson vs. Donovan Ruddock II
 Mike Tyson vs. Peter McNeeley (He's Back), which marked his return after serving three years in prison.
 Frank Bruno vs. Mike Tyson II and Christy Martin vs. Deirdre Gogarty on the same program.
 Bruce Seldon vs. Mike Tyson
 Mike Tyson vs. Evander Holyfield and Evander Holyfield vs. Mike Tyson II, the latter of which ended with Tyson disqualified for biting off part of Holyfield's right ear.
 Mike Tyson vs. Francois Botha
 Mike Tyson vs. Andrew Golota
 Lennox Lewis vs. Mike Tyson (joint collaboration with HBO)
 Evander Holyfield also headlined:
 Buster Douglas vs. Evander Holyfield
 Evander Holyfield vs. Michael Moorer II
 Pernell Whitaker vs. Julio César Chávez
 Nigel Benn defended his WBC Super-Middleweight title against Gerald McClellan in a dramatic fight that almost turned tragic by winning on a tenth-round technical knockout at London, England, on February 25, 1995. McClellan subsequently spent two months in a coma due to a massive brain injury and suffered blindness, impaired hearing, and inability to walk. Benn himself suffered from a broken nose and jaw, urinating blood and a shadow of a brain injury.
 Diego Corrales defeated José Luis Castillo for the WBC lightweight title in a 10th-round TKO on May 7, 2005. The fight is almost universally regarded as the best fight of 2005.
 A ShoBox match between Sechew Powell and Cornelius Bundrage on May 6, 2005, featured an extremely rare double knockdown. Both threw simultaneous rights to the chin, although the referee didn't score any single knockdowns, possibly due to the shock of the occurrence.
 A ShoBox match between Allan Green and Jaidon Codrington, on November 4, 2005, was won via a knockout by Green 18 seconds into the bout. It was named the "Knockout of the Year" by The Ring.
 The four fight series of Israel Vázquez and Rafael Márquez.  Marquez won the first fight on March 3, 2007, after Vazquez couldn't continue after round 7.  Vázquez would knock out Marquez in the sixth round of their second fight on August 4, 2007.  This fight won Fight of the Year and Round of the Year (Round 3) honors for 2007 by The Ring.  Their 3rd fight was considered to be the most exciting, which took place on March 1, 2008.  Vazquez won the fight by split decision, after an incredible twelfth-round which saw Vázquez knock Márquez into the ropes, which prevented Marquez from hitting the canvas, resulting in a critical knockdown in the closing seconds of the fight.  This fight was recognized as Fight of the Year for 2008 by Ring magazine as well. Marquez won their fourth fight by a third-round technical knockout.
 Manny Pacquiao vs. Shane Mosley was aired on May 7, 2011.
 As part of the build-up to Amir Khan vs. Carlos Molina on December 15, 2012, Showtime presented a fight between Leo Santa Cruz and Alberto Guevara on the sister CBS broadcast network, in its first boxing telecast since 1997.
 Floyd Mayweather Jr. signed with Showtime in 2013. His fights comprise:
 Floyd Mayweather Jr. vs. Robert Guerrero
 Floyd Mayweather Jr. vs. Canelo Álvarez
 Floyd Mayweather Jr. vs. Marcos Maidana and Floyd Mayweather Jr. vs. Marcos Maidana II
 Floyd Mayweather Jr. vs. Manny Pacquiao (joint collaboration with HBO)
 Floyd Mayweather Jr. vs. Andre Berto
 Floyd Mayweather Jr. vs. Conor McGregor
 Floyd Mayweather Jr. vs. Logan Paul
 On June 25, 2016, CBS broadcast a WBC welterweight championship fight between Shawn Porter and Keith Thurman, marking the first boxing event broadcast on CBS in primetime since 1978. The telecast, although part of the Premier Boxing Champions arrangement, was produced by Showtime and billed as Showtime Championship Boxing on CBS presented by Premier Boxing Champions. Thurman retained the WBC title via a unanimous decision.
 On March 4, 2017,  CBS aired Thurman's WBA/WBC welterweight unification bout against Danny García. Once again, the fight was broadcast in primetime as a Showtime presentation of Premier Boxing Champions. The fight, which Thurman won in a split decision, received a 2.2 Nielsen rating (a 22% gain over Thurman vs. Porter).
 On April 29, 2017, Showtime broadcast the Anthony Joshua vs. Wladimir Klitschko fight from Wembley Stadium in London to unify the WBA (Super), IBF and IBO heavyweight titles. Uniquely, both Showtime and HBO held rights to the fight, but only Showtime held rights to broadcast it live.
 On December 1, 2018, Deontay Wilder vs. Tyson Fury was aired from Los Angeles.
 On January 19, 2019, Manny Pacquiao vs. Adrien Broner was aired from Las Vegas.

On August 29, 2021 Jake Paul vs. Tyron Woodley, fight held in Cleveland which ultimately Paul won by split decision, later resulted in a rematch.
 On November 6, 2021, Canelo Álvarez vs. Caleb Plant fight held in Las Vegas, when Canelo becomes the first-ever undisputed world super-middleweight champion.

On December 12, 2021, the Jake Paul vs. Tyron Woodley II, rematch was held in Tampa which Paul ultimately won by a 6th round KO.
On April 16, 2022, the Errol Spence Jr. vs. Yordenis Ugás fight was held from AT&T Stadium in Arlington, Texas, Which Spence won by a 10th round TKO and became the Unified Welterweight Champion.

Commentators
Brian Custer, currently serves as host of the program. The main broadcast team features Mauro Ranallo on blow-by-blow, Al Bernstein as chief color analyst and (when he is available) boxer Abner Mares as an analyst. Amir Khan, Austin Trout, and Daniel Jacobs have served as guest analysts. The third role was previously filled by Antonio Tarver, Ferdie Pacheco, Bobby Czyz, and Paulie Malignaggi among others. Veteran Jim Gray is chief reporter. Former top commentators include Steve Albert and Gus Johnson.

The New Generation features Barry Tompkins on blow-by-blow, and Steve Farhood and Raul Marquez as the expert analysts.

See also
 Premier Boxing Champions

References

External links
 

Boxing television series
Showtime (TV network) original programming
CBS Sports
1986 American television series debuts
1990s American television series
2000s American television series
2010s American television series
2020s American television series
English-language television shows
Championship Boxing